Walshestown North is a townland in County Westmeath, Ireland.

Walshestown North is one of 64 townlands of the civil parish of Mullingar in the barony of Moyashel and Magheradernon in the Province of Leinster. The neighbouring townlands are: Ballard to the north, Tullaghan to the east, Walshestown South to the south, Slane More to the west and Ballyboy to the north–west.

In the 1911 census of Ireland there were 11 houses and 52 inhabitants in the townland.

References

External links
Map of Walshestown North at openstreetmap.org
Walshestown North at The IreAtlas Townland Data Base
Walshestown North at Townlands.ie
Walshestown North at the Placenames Database of Ireland

Townlands of County Westmeath